Dunfermline West was a county constituency represented in the House of Commons of the Parliament of the United Kingdom from 1983 until 2005. It elected one Member of Parliament (MP) using the first-past-the-post voting system.

Before 1983 the area was covered by the Dunfermline constituency and from 2005 the seat was replaced by the new Dunfermline and West Fife.

Boundaries

The seat of Dunfermline West contained all of the town of Dunfermline as well as territory on the north bank of the Firth of Forth. It took in the affluent villages of Limekilns, Crossford and Cairneyhill; it also included coalfield communities such as High Valleyfield, Saline, Blairhall and Oakley.

Members of Parliament

Elections

Elections in the 1980s

Elections in the 1990s

Elections in the 2000s

References 

Historic parliamentary constituencies in Scotland (Westminster)
Constituencies of the Parliament of the United Kingdom established in 1983
Constituencies of the Parliament of the United Kingdom disestablished in 2005
Politics of Dunfermline
Politics of Fife